Harumitsu (written:  or ) is a masculine Japanese given name. Notable people with the name include:

, Japanese golfer
, Japanese cyclist

Japanese masculine given names